Johan De Muynck (born 30 May 1948 in Sleidinge, East Flanders) is a Belgian former professional road racing cyclist who raced from 1971 to 1983. The highlight of his career was his overall win in the 1978 Giro d'Italia. He was an outstanding climber. Other Grand Tour highlights include a very strong performance in the closely contested 1976 Giro d'Italia where he held the Maglia Rosa until the final time trial finishing on the podium in 2nd just nineteen seconds behind Felice Gimondi. He also rode well in the 1980 and 1981 editions of the Tour de France where he finished 4th and 7th respectively. Up to Remco Evenepoel's victory in the 2022 Vuelta a España,  De Muynck was the last Belgian rider to win a Grand Tour.

Major results
Sources:

1970
 4th Ronde van Vlaanderen Amateur
1971
 3rd Scheldeprijs
 8th GP Stad Zottegem
 10th GP Flandria
 10th Omloop van de Westhoek
1972
 3rd Leeuwse Pijl
 5th Overall Tour de Luxembourg
 5th Omloop van de Westhoek
 7th Circuit des XI Villes
 9th Omloop van Oost-Vlaanderen
 10th E3 Harelbeke
1973
 1st Brabantse Pijl
1975
 1st Stage 5a Tour of Belgium
 2nd Omloop Schelde-Durme
 7th Omloop van het Zuidwesten
 10th Brabantse Pijl
 10th Milano–Torino
1976
 1st  Overall Tour de Romandie
1st Stages 2, 4 & 5b (ITT)
 2nd Overall Giro d'Italia
Held  after stages 19-21
1st Stage 6
 4th Giro dell'Emilia
 7th Trofeo Matteotti
1977
 2nd Overall Volta a Catalunya
1st Stage 5
 2nd Overall À travers Lausanne
 2nd Paris–Tours
 4th Giro dell'Emilia
 5th Overall Tour de Romandie 
 8th Overall Tour de Suisse
 8th Overall Giro di Puglia
 8th Giro di Lombardia
 8th Giro del Veneto
1978
 1st  Overall Giro d'Italia
Held  after Stages 3-20
1st Stage 3 
 7th Overall GP du Midi-Libre
1st Stage 4
 8th Coppa Sabatini
 9th Overall Tirreno–Adriatico
 9th Giro di Lombardia
 10th Trofeo Laigueglia
 10th Giro dell'Emilia
1979
 6th Milano–Torino
1980
 3rd Leeuwse Pijl
 4th Overall Tour de France
 7th Overall Vuelta a España
 8th Druivenkoers Overijse
 8th GP Eddy Merckx
1981
 1st Subida a Arrate
 2nd GP Villafranca de Ordizia
 7th Overall Tour de France
 8th Overall Tour de Romandie
 9th Giro di Lombardia
1983
 4th Circuit des Frontières

Grand Tour general classification results timeline

References

External links

1948 births
Living people
Belgian male cyclists
Belgian Giro d'Italia stage winners
Giro d'Italia winners
People from Evergem
Cyclists from East Flanders
People from Lievegem